Emily Kristine Pedersen (born 7 March 1996) is a Danish professional golfer who plays on the Ladies European Tour and LPGA Tour. She had a successful amateur career winning the 2013 International European Ladies Amateur Championship and the 2014 British Ladies Amateur Golf Championship. Turning professional in early 2015 she had a successful first season, finishing runner-up in the Deloitte Ladies Open and the Lacoste Ladies Open de France before winning the Hero Women's Indian Open. She was named LET Rookie of the Year for 2015.

Pedersen earned her card for the 2022 LPGA Tour through qualifying school.

Amateur wins
2010 Mølleån Open, Danish Match Play, Royal Tour Damer III
2011 Doral Publix Junior Classic (14–15)
2012 Furesøpokalen, DGU Elite Tour Damer III, Doral-Publix Junior Classic
2013 Spanish Ladies Amateur, German Girls Open, International European Ladies Amateur Championship, DGU Elite Tour Damer Finale, Doral-Publix Junior Classic (16–18)
2014 British Ladies Amateur

Source:

Professional wins (6)

Ladies European Tour wins (5)

1 Co-sanctioned by Ladies Asian Golf Tour

LET playoff record (1–2)

Danish Golf Tour wins (1)

Results in LPGA majors
Results not in chronological order before 2019.

CUT = missed the half-way cut
NT = no tournament
"T" = tied

World ranking
Position in Women's World Golf Rankings at the end of each calendar year.

Team appearances
Amateur
European Girls' Team Championship (representing the Denmark): 2011, 2012
Junior Vagliano Trophy: (representing the Continent of Europe): 2011 (winners)
Junior Ryder Cup (representing Europe): 2012, 2014
European Ladies' Team Championship (representing Denmark): 2013
Junior Solheim Cup: (representing Europe): 2013
Vagliano Trophy (representing the Continent of Europe): 2013 (winners)
Espirito Santo Trophy (representing Denmark): 2014

Professional
The Queens (representing Europe): 2015
Solheim Cup (representing Europe): 2017, 2021 (winners)

Solheim Cup record

References

External links

Danish female golfers
Ladies European Tour golfers
LPGA Tour golfers
Solheim Cup competitors for Europe
Winners of ladies' major amateur golf championships
Olympic golfers of Denmark
Golfers at the 2020 Summer Olympics
Golfers at the 2014 Summer Youth Olympics
Sportspeople from Copenhagen
1996 births
Living people
20th-century Danish women
21st-century Danish women